Lake Hope is an ephemeral salt lake in the far north of South Australia.

Description
Both Lake Hope and nearby Red Lake are on the southern side of the Cooper Creek in the sand dune country. Both are also found within the boundaries of Mulka and Lake Hope Stations.

The lakes are both within the Lake Eyre basin and a fishing licence has been issued for each of the lakes for an operation out of Mulka Station.

The lake is filled periodically from the flooding of Cooper Creek. In 1990 waters from Cooper Creek reached Lake Hope but did not reach Lake Eyre.

The traditional owners name for the lake is Pando penunie which means great lake. The first Europeans to discover the lake were S. J. and R. J. Stuckey in October 1859. The named the lake because they hoped for greater fortune in the future. Thomas Elder took up the first pastoral lease in the area in 1860.

Lake Hope is located within the boundaries of the wetland system known as the Coongie Lakes which is both listed  internationally under the Ramsar Convention and within Australia with an identical listing in "A Directory of Important Wetlands in Australia".

See also

 List of lakes of South Australia

References

Saline lakes of South Australia
Lake Hope
Endorheic lakes of Australia
Lake Hope